Yahya John Mandlakayise Hlophe (born 1 January 1959 in Stanger, KwaZulu-Natal) is Judge President of the Western Cape Division of the High Court of South Africa.

Background and career

Born in Stanger, Natal, he was educated at the University of Natal; the University of Fort Hare and Cambridge University. Hlophe taught law at the University of Transkei, South Africa, before being appointed in 1995, aged 36, to sit as the first black judge in the High Court in Cape Town. He was the first full-time academic to be appointed as a High Court Judge. He was appointed to head the court in 2000.

Controversies

  In a 2004 case between Health Minister Manto Tshabalala-Msimang and elements of the pharmaceutical industry, Hlophe was accused of "unreasonably" delaying his judgement on leave to appeal. In an unprecedented step the unsuccessful party in the matter had been forced by Hlophe's failure to either grant or refuse leave to appeal and had applied directly to the Supreme Court of Appeal of South Africa for leave to appeal. Having been informed that the application would be made directly to the Supreme Court of Appeal, he refused leave to appeal days before the Supreme Court of Appeal considered the matter. His ruling was summarily overturned by the Supreme Court of Appeal in a judgment that was harshly critical of him. Hlophe was reported to have said with regard to the ruling that he "... couldn’t care less." A complaint about his conduct was laid with the Judicial Service Commission.
 In 2004 Hlophe wrote a report to Chief Justice Pius Langa alleging racism at the Cape Bar. He also accused his deputy, Deputy Judge President Jeanette Traverso, of racism. In the aftermath of controversy as to the authorship of a majority judgment in the name of Judge NJ Yekiso in the same matter that had attracted the Supreme Court of Appeal's censure, Hlophe accused certain white judges and leading members of the Cape Bar of racism in a 43-page report submitted to the Minister of Justice in November 2004.
 In 2005 Hlophe was reported to have said that he allocated an Afrikaans language rights case to senior Cape High Court Judge Wilfred Thring "because I knew he would fuck up the trial and then it could be set right on appeal". He was reported to have repeated this in front of numerous witnesses, including senior advocate Norman Arendse SC, who wrote to Chief Justice Pius Langa about the incident. Denying he had made the remark, Hlophe claimed there was a smear campaign against him.
 Also in 2005, Hlophe was reported to have called a Cape Town attorney, Joshua Greeff, a "piece of white shit who is not fit to walk in the corridors of the High Court". He also suggested that Greeff should go back to Holland. Greeff is not Dutch. Hlophe denied making the remarks.
 In June 2006, the JSC was asked to investigate complaints that Hlophe's son received a bursary from a large Cape Town firm of attorneys, Smith Tabata Buchanan Boyes (STBB). Derek Wille, former STBB partner and a university friend of Hlophe, said the payments had come from a bursary scheme "to help disadvantaged students". Hlophe had appointed Wille to the bench as an acting judge on a number of occasions. Reported to the JSC for a possible conflict of interests, he claimed he did not know who was paying for his son's education. The JSC accepted his word.
 In early 2006 it was reported that Hlophe had, without the necessary Ministerial consent, taken a remunerated position on the board of Oasis, an asset management company.
 It was subsequently reported that Hlophe had, whilst on the Oasis payroll, considered a matter involving one of his colleagues, Judge Siraj Desai and given Oasis permission to sue him.
 In July 2006 Justice Minister Brigitte Mabandla permitted Hlophe four months' leave of absence.
 In November 2007 Hlophe was reported to have written to the Department of Justice demanding that his official motor vehicle, a three-year-old Mercedes Benz, be upgraded to a Porsche Cayenne. He argued that his position as Judge President warranted this upgrade. When contacted by members of the press, Hlophe is reported to have asked "What has this got to do with you? My purchase of a vehicle has got absolutely nothing to do with you," It is reported that when reminded that the car would be purchased using taxpayers' money, he stated that it would "never, ever be approved". It nonetheless was.
 On 10 March 2008, Judge Hlophe, in a Cape High Court ruling, ordered the eviction of approximately 20,000 shack dwellers residing in Joe Slovo in Langa to make way for the controversial N2 Gateway Housing Project. The ruling was subsequently criticised by residents themselves, the Western Cape Anti-Eviction Campaign, and well-known legal and constitutional court experts such as Pierre de Vos. In August 2008, Joe Slovo residents took their appeal to the Constituational Court which criticised the ruling by Hlophe. Concourt Justice Kate O'Regan stated that "It’s one of the things that really bothers me … I couldn’t imagine an order for eviction that didn’t set out where and how the respondents would be accommodated,"
In March 2008 Constitutional Court Justices Bess Nkabinde and Chris Jafta stated that Hlophe had personally tried to convince them to give judgments in favour of then South African President Jacob Zuma on two cases that implicated Zuma of in corrupt activities. It was reported that ten years after the incidences no action had been yet been taken against Hlophe despite the serious nature of the accusations.
 On 30 July 2009, Judge Hlophe was served summons by US law professor Winston Nagan. Nagan was demanding R6-million in damages from Hlophe, who, he says, "insulted and defamed" him. When professor Nagan's right to sue Judge Hlophe was upheld by the Western Cape High Court, Paul Ngobeni a long-standing friend and supporter of Judge Hlophe, was outraged. "It’s horrifying! It’s outrageous! Here you have a foreigner, who comes out of the United States, a country where there is an absolute prohibition against suing judges for their judgement," exclaimed Paul Ngobeni, who, like Professor Nagan, was born in South Africa and subsequently became a permanent resident of the United States. Paul Ngobeni also seems to be unaware that Judge Hlophe was not being sued for a judgement, but for derogatory statements allegedly made regarding the work habits and ethics of Professor Nagan.
On 15 January 2020 Western Cape Deputy Judge President Patricia Goliath lodged a complaint with the Judicial Services Commission (JSC) alleging a wide range of serious incidents of misconduct by Hlophe. These included allegations of "attempting to influence judicial appointments, assaulting fellow judges, sexual impropriety and creating a climate of hostility and fear in chambers." One such notable incidence was in the 2017 Earthlife Africa judgment where Hlophe is accused of acting in a biased manner so as to protect then South African President Jacob Zuma. The case was involved a controversial deal to procure nuclear power plants from Russia. In response to the incident the General Council of the Bar urged Hlophe and his wife to request special leave pending deliberations into the complaint.

Consideration by the Judicial Service Commission

Hlophe became the subject of allegations of misconduct on a number of matters during 2005–2006, which were referred for investigation by the Judicial Service Commission.
The JSC considered the following four complaints: Firstly, that Hlophe had accepted payments from the Oasis Group without statutorily required Ministerial consent; secondly that he had improperly granted permission, while in receipt of such payments, for Oasis to sue Judge Desai for defamation; thirdly that he had subjected a legal practitioner to a racist insult; and finally that he had made disparaging remarks to counsel about a fellow judge to whom the Judge President had allocated a contentious case.

In October 2007, in a divided vote, the Commission decided by an undisclosed majority that there was insufficient evidence to proceed with a public enquiry into the allegations.

The decision was the subject of controversy and was criticised by, amongst others, former Constitutional and Appeal Court Judge Johann Kriegler, whose criticism was published in the Sunday Times, a widely read, nationally circulated newspaper.

On 9 October 2007, nine senior members of the Cape Bar Council wrote to the Cape Town- based Cape Times newspaper in support of former constitutional and appeals court judge Johann Kriegler's comment at the weekend that Hlophe was "unfit for the Bench".

Responding to the controversy the Judicial Services Commission on 18 October 2007 issued an explanation of their decision which stated that they had considered the four complaints.  It pointed out that it had no general disciplinary jurisdiction, being limited by section 177 of the South African Constitution to the ability to find a judge guilty of "gross misconduct".  In this case, they said, the only charge that might merit that finding was that Hlophe had received payments from Oasis when not permitted to do so.  With respect to that complaint the JSC stated that Hlophe had alleged that he had received oral permission from the (by then late) Minister of Justice, that the Ministry of Justice had stated that "... it could not say that oral permission had not been given" and that there was accordingly "... no evidence of the absence of consent".  The majority of the JSC accordingly found that "... the facts did not make out a prima facie case".  The JSC stated further that "[a]lthough not amounting, in the view of the majority of the Commission, to impeachable conduct, the grant of leave to Oasis to sue Judge Desai (leave of the Court to sue a Judge being a legal requirement) was considered by all Commissioners to be a matter warranting adverse comment".  With regard to the alleged racist incident the JSC stated that the complainant had asked that the matter not be pursued.  Finally, with regard to the alleged disparagement of a fellow judge the JSC recorded that the senior counsel allegedly able to support the allegation had submitted an affidavit which did not in fact do so.  It recorded that Hlophe had admitted discussing the matter with another senior counsel, and had conceded that that was improper, apologising for doing so.

Members of the faculty of law at the University of Cape Town also questioned whether Cape Judge President John Hlophe was fit to occupy his position.

Conversely, the Black Lawyers Association criticised Judge Kriegler for his "... unsolicited attack ..." on Judge Hlophe and by implication the Judicial Services Committee, which had, it stated, cleared him. "In allowing himself to comment at all upon a matter with which the JSC was seized, and of which it has now lawfully disposed, Judge Kriegler placed himself in contempt of the lawfully constituted authority, and evinced disrespect for the members of that august body, not excluding the Chief Justice," said the BLA's judicial committee chairperson, Dumisa Ntsebeza SC.

On 19 April 2010 the high court in Cape Town found the proceedings of the Judicial Service Commission (JSC), where it dismissed a complaint of gross misconduct against Western Cape Judge President John Hlophe, were "unconstitutional and invalid".

Allegation of interference with Constitutional Court Judges

On 30 May 2008 the judges of the Constitutional Court issued a statement reporting that they had referred Judge Hlophe to the Judicial Service Commission (JSC) as a result of what they described in their statement as an approach to certain of them "... in an improper attempt to influence this Court's pending judgement in one or more cases". The statement stated further that the complaint related to four matters in which either Thint (Pty) Ltd or the Deputy President, Jacob Zuma, were involved. It was subsequently reported that Hlophe was alleged by unnamed sources to have approached Judges Nkabine and Jaftha separately in their offices and to have told them that he would be next Chief Justice and that they should consider their future – and rule in favour of Zuma.

Judge Hlophe was reported to have rejected the allegations as "... utter rubbish ..." and as "... another ploy ..." to damage his reputation.

The Cape Bar Council on 2 June 2008 indicated that it had requested the JSC to "... facilitate Judge Hlophe's absence from office pending the final determination of the complaint ...", stating that it was "... untenable for Judge Hlophe to continue in office pending the determination of the complaint ...".

The Law Society of South Africa, the umbrella body for attorneys throughout the country, was reported to have expressed its "... grave concern ..." and to have stated that it had "... no doubt that the Constitutional Court judges considered the matter carefully before lodging the complaint".

Attorney Peter Horn, the President of the Law Society of the Cape of Good Hope, representative body of attorneys in the Western and Eastern Cape, urged Judge Hlophe to take a leave of absence and that there needed to be a "... sense of great urgency ...", and that the JSC should make a special effort to get its members together before the end of the week.  Noting that the Society did not prejudge the issue, he stated further on the Society's behalf that "... if the allegations are found to be correct, then clearly the judge president cannot continue to serve on the bench".

The JSC met on Friday 6 June 2008, but adjourned as a result of the Constitutional Court's not having answered interrogatories by the meeting.

Hlophe was reported on 6 June 2008 to have taken leave of absence, and to have been replaced temporarily by his deputy, Jeanette Traverso.

On 10 June 2008 Judge Hlophe lodged a complaint with the JSC against the judges of the Constitutional Court for violating his rights by publicising the complaint against him and by "prejudging" the issue. He was also defended in an open letter from Paul Ngobeni to the judges of the Constitutional Court.

The Constitutional Court delivered its full exposition of its complaint to the JSC on 17 June 2008. In it they reported that he had approached Judges Jafta and Nkabinde.  He had told Nkabinde that he had a "mandate" to approach her and that the four cases referred to above were important for the future of Jacob Zuma.  He told her that there was "no real case against Mr Zuma and that it was now important to hold in his favour".  Upon being asked what business it was of his to discuss the matter with her, Hlophe is reported to have replied that "... Mr Zuma was being "persecuted" as he [Hlophe] had been persecuted".  Judge Jafta confirmed that a similar approach had been made to him, while refusing to divulge certain parts of the conversation, which he said were confidential and which he would keep so as a result of his long acquaintance, and friendship, with Hlophe. He stated that Hlophe had told him that he was "... our last hope ...". Both judges stated that they had dealt with the matter firmly and rejected Judge Hlophe's advances.

The Court also explained that Judge Hlophe misunderstood their role.  As complainants they could not prejudge the matter as the JSC would adjudge it, not them.

Hlophe was reported to have submitted a 71-page response on Monday 30 June 2008.

The Judicial Services Commission's disciplinary committee released a statement at the end of August 2009, saying that it was not going to continue with the investigation into the Constitutional Court's complaint against him.  The court says it "has no comment to make" on the decision.  However, this decision was taken by a six-four majority of its ten members.  The decision has been strongly criticised by legal academics, who say this issue could only have been resolved through cross-examination.

The Premier of the Western Cape, Helen Zille, then instituted and urgent motion with the Western Cape High Court that the JSC disciplinary committee's decision should be set aside.  Two reasons were supplied in support of this claim.  The first was that the JSC's disciplinary committee had not been properly constituted at the time of reaching their decision, by virtue of the fact that three of its constitutionally required thirteen members, including the Premier herself, had not been present.  The second was that the decision had not been supported by a majority of the JSC disciplinary committee's full membership, having only six votes for the decision out of a possible thirteen.  Judges RJW Jones and S Ebrahim found in favour of the Premier, and ordered that "the proceedings before of the Judicial Services Commission on 20 to 22 July 2009 and 15 August 2009, and the decision to dismiss the complaint and countercomplaint which were the subject of those proceedings" were "unconstitutional and invalid and are set aside".

The JSC and Hlophe then appealed the judgement at the Supreme Court of Appeal (SCA).  Judge of Appeal TD Cloete, with Judges Harms, Lewis, Ponnan and Majiedt concurring, dismissed the appeal with costs.  Judge Cloete also stated that "it is the constitutional mandate of the JSC in terms of s177 of the Constitution to investigate allegations of judicial misconduct and to make a finding on whether or not a judge is guilty of gross misconduct.  The JSC (properly constituted and by majority vote) has done neither. The order made by the court a quo setting the decision of the JSC aside was accordingly imperative to enable the JSC to perform the function it is still obliged to perform."

In a separate case regarding the same decision of JSC, Judge of Appeal PE Streicher of the SCA, with Judges Brand, Cachalia, Theron and Seriti concurring, also upheld an appeal brought by the not-for-profit advocacy group Freedom Under Law, finding that "the decision of the Judicial Service Commission at its meeting on 15 August 2009, that 'the evidence in respect of the complaint does not justify a finding that Hlophe JP is guilty of gross misconduct' and that the matter accordingly be 'treated as finalised', is reviewed and set aside" and setting aside a previous North Gauteng High Court finding to the contrary.  The judge also found that the JSC had a "constitutional duty to properly investigate allegations of gross misconduct on part of [a] judge" and that "cross-examination [is] required to resolve disputes of fact".

Legal academic, Pierre de Vos, writes that Hlophe intends to appeal the SCA judgements in the Constitutional Court, adding that this would create "a fascinating constitutional problem which us lawyers will discuss for years to come", since only four of the currently sitting justices of the Constitutional Court were not complainants in the original case, and at least eight of the full eleven Constitutional Court justices are required to constitute a quorum.

Return to work

Hlophe returned to work in 2009, saying he had returned because he had been "out too long" and was tired of living off taxpayers' money. The settlement talks had "stalled" and the stalemate was preventing him from "reaching his best potential in the profession".

Just before Zuma announced his official nomination of Sandile Ngcobo as South Africa's next chief justice, Hlophe said that his decision to side with Zuma had been his undoing.

In September 2009, Hlophe received permission from the Justice Ministry to return to work.

References

External links

The Hlophe Saga: Step by Step Legalbrief Today
Cape High Court Judgement for the Joe Slovo/N2 Gateway evictions case (PDF) Western Cape Anti-Eviction Campaign

1959 births
Living people
People from KwaDukuza Local Municipality
Zulu people
20th-century South African judges
21st-century South African judges
University of Natal alumni
University of Fort Hare alumni
Alumni of the University of Cambridge
Jacob Zuma